Lowball can refer to:

Low-ball, a persuasion, negotiation, and selling technique
Lowball (poker), a variant of the card game poker, in which hand values are reversed so that the lowest-valued hand wins
Lowball glass, a short drinking glass typically used for serving liquor

See also
 Highball